Black Moth were an English stoner rock/metal band from Leeds. They cite Black Sabbath, The Stooges, Mastodon, Red Fang, Pissed Jeans, Drunk in Hell, Kvelertak, Uncle Acid & the Deadbeats, Turbowolf, Blacklisters, Nick Cave and the Bad Seeds, Swans, Bo Ningen, Goat and Arabrot and L7 as influences.

The band released three full-length albums, all produced by Jim Sclavunos (Grinderman, Nick Cave and the Bad Seeds). While initially a quartet, the band saw the addition of guitarist Nico Carew in 2014, but he would leave the band in 2015 to focus on his other group (X-Ray Cat Trio) and was subsequently replaced by Federica Gialanze. Their second album, Condemned to Hope, had its cover created by Roger Dean. It generated mixed to positive reviews from reputable websites like TeamRock, Prog and PopMatters.

In September 2019, the band announced the end of their activities, with a farewell show booked for 6 December of the same year.

Discography

Albums
 The Killing Jar (2012)
 Condemned to Hope (2014)
 Anatomical Venus (2018)

Singles 
 "The Articulate Dead" (2010)
 "Black Moth" / "XM-3A" (split single, 2011)
 "Savage Dancer" / "Tree of Woe" (2013)

Members 
 Harriet Hyde – vocals (2010–2019)
 Federica Gialanze – guitars (2015–2019)
 Jim Swainston – guitars (2010–2019)
 Dave Vachon – bass (2010–2019)
 Dom McCready – drums (2010–2019)
 Nico Carew – guitars (2014–2015)

References

External links
Official website

Musical groups established in 2010
English heavy metal musical groups
English stoner rock musical groups
2010 establishments in England
Musical groups from Leeds
Musical groups disestablished in 2019
2019 disestablishments in England